Sir John Langstrother  (died 1471) was Treasurer of England, prior of the Knights of St John in England, and Preceptor of Balsall.

A son of Thomas Langstrother of Crosswaite, he was by 1463 a councillor of the Yorkist king Edward IV. He was an administrator of the Knights of St John of Jerusalem and on 9 March 1469 was unanimously chosen as Prior of England, the Order's chief officer in the kingdom. Following the defeat of Edward's supporters by the Earl of Warwick on 26 July 1469 at the Battle of Edgecote Moor he was appointed Lord High Treasurer by the short-lived regime of the Duke of Clarence and Warwick, but was dismissed by Edward when he regained power in mid-September. He was reinstated in October 1470 as Treasurer and Warden of the Mint after the temporary re-accession of Henry VI, who had been restored with the help of Clarence and Warwick. Langstrother's tenures as Lord High Treasurer and Warden of the Mint occurred during the Great Bullion Famine and the Great Slump in England.

After the Yorkist victory at the Battle of Tewkesbury on 4 May 1471, where he had shared command of the Lancastrian centre, he sought sanctuary in Tewkesbury Abbey but was taken out and executed in Tewkesbury town centre two days later. He was buried in the Order's hospital of St John at Clerkenwell.

See also
 The Crusades
 HM Treasury

References

External links
Bedford, William Kirkpatrick Riland, 1826–1905; Holbeche, Richard, b.1850 archive.org The Order of the Hospital of St. John of Jerusalem; being a history of the English Hospitallers of St. John, their rise and progress (1902) London F.E. Robinson and co

15th century in England
People of the Wars of the Roses
15th-century English people
Lord High Treasurers of England
People executed under the Yorkists
Priors of Saint John of Jerusalem in England
Year of birth unknown
1471 deaths